"The Tunnel" was a pre-recorded American television play first broadcast on December 10, 1959, as part of the CBS television series, Playhouse 90.  It was the sixth episode of the fourth season of Playhouse 90 and the 123rd episode overall.

Plot
The play is set in the Civil War and depicts the plan by a Union officer (Henry Pleasants) to end a stalemate by digging a tunnel under Confederate forces and then exploding the enemy with dynamite. The story was based on the Battle of the Crater that occurred in July 1864 near Petersburg, Virginia.

Production
Fred Coe was the producer.  Delbert Mann was the director, and David Shaw wrote the teleplay. Eddie Albert, the star of the next production, "The Silver Whistle", hosted the broadcast.

The cast included Richard Boone as Lt. Col. Henry Pleasants, Rip Torn as Lt. Jacob Douty, Onslow Stevens as Gen. Ambrose Burnside, Jack Weston as Wocziki, Ken Lynch as Sgt. Reese, Robert Carson as Major Gen. George Meade, Sandy Kenyon as Martinson, and Bartlett Robinson as Captain Handley.

Reception
The climactic scenes of the crater formed by exclusion, with wounded and maimed soldiers dead, dying, and screaming, was described by Associated Press writer Cynthia Lowry as "a grisly editorial against human slaughter." The UPI described these scenes as "television triumphs."

In The New York Times, Richard F. Shepard found the production to be realistic with impressive staging of busy and loud battle scenes.

References

1959 American television episodes
Playhouse 90 (season 4) episodes
1959 television plays